The FBI Story is a 1959 American drama film starring James Stewart, and produced and directed by Mervyn LeRoy. The screenplay by Richard L. Breen and John Twist is based on a book by Don Whitehead.

Plot
John Michael ("Chip") Hardesty (James Stewart) describes a murder, seen in a flashback. He then narrates the incident in which Jack Gilbert Graham (Nick Adams) took out life insurance on his mother and planted a bomb in her luggage for a flight she was taking from Denver, Colorado in 1955.
Hardesty is shown delivering a lecture to the Federal Bureau of Investigation (FBI). He begins to recount his history as an agent of the bureau, which is shown as a series of flashbacks comprising the remainder of the film.

In May 1924, Hardesty was working as a government clerk for the nascent FBI in Knoxville, Tennessee. He proposes to his sweetheart, a nagging librarian named Lucy Ann Ballard (Vera Miles). Ballard thinks Hardesty's potential is being wasted by the FBI and wants him to start practicing law. They marry with this idea in mind. Hardesty is inspired to stay with the bureau after hearing a speech from its new director, J. Edgar Hoover. Lucy Ann reveals that she is pregnant; she permits Hardesty to stay in the bureau for a preliminary year.

Hardesty is sent to the South to investigate the Ku Klux Klan. He is moved around until he is sent to Ute City, Wade County, Oklahoma to investigate a series of murders of Native Americans who had oil-rich mineral land and rights. The FBI was compelled to investigate after one of the murders was committed on federal government land. The FBI forensics laboratory ties the doctored wills and life insurance policies of the murder victims to a local banker, Dwight McCutcheon (Fay Roope), with the typewriter that he used. Lucy Ann, already the mother of three, suffers a miscarriage around this time.

On June 17, 1933, three FBI agents were escorting Frank "Jelly" Nash from a train to a car outside the Union Station in Kansas City when they were ambushed and killed. This event changed the FBI; a year later, Congress gave the FBI statutory authority to carry guns and make arrests. Hardesty and his friend Sam Crandall (Murray Hamilton) are excited by his prospect, but Lucy Ann does not like the idea at all.

After receiving a tip, Hardesty and Crandall head to Spider Lake, Wisconsin, on April 22, 1934, but barking dogs alert the gangsters and they scatter. The agents then head to a nearby country store to call the Chicago office. When they get there they find Baby Face Nelson (William Phipps) holding two men hostage. Nelson opens fire, fatally wounding Crandall.

Hardesty then recounts his involvement in the capture and/or deaths of numerous infamous mobsters of the day including John Dillinger, Pretty Boy Floyd, Baby Face Nelson, and Machine Gun Kelly. Unable to get Chip to obey her to leave the bureau, Lucy decides to leave their marriage and take his children from him. They move into her parents' home. While preparing an Easter egg hunt, Lucy ironically calls her mother "a nag, a real nag." Later, Lucy's mother sarcastically tells Lucy that Lucy's father is also "a nag." Realizing what she is and what she has done, Lucy decides to return home and bring back Chip's children.

With the U.S. entry into World War II, "enemy aliens" (Americans of Japanese, German, and Italian descent) are quickly rounded up by the FBI and sent to internment camps to prevent possible espionage and collaboration with Axis powers. The ranks of the bureau are quickly doubled from about 2,500 to more than 5,000 agents. One of those aspiring new agents is the deceased Sam's son George who is worried that he will never live up to his father's reputation; a romance buds between him and Hardesty's oldest daughter. Hardesty's only son announces his enlistment in the U.S. Marine Corps. Lucy objects, placing her own interests ahead of her country's.

Hardesty is sent to South America to relieve three agents whose identities have been compromised. The third is revealed to be George; he has been deep in the jungle intercepting secret radio messages. Local authorities move in, forcing the FBI agents to destroy the equipment and flee. Back in the U.S., Hardesty and Lucy receive a telegram informing them their son had been killed in the line of duty during the Battle of Iwo Jima.

The final case depicted stems from a New York City clothes cleaner finding a hollow half-dollar with microfilm inside. The FBI investigates and tracks the owner of the clothing, leading to his capture as well as that of an associate.

Hardesty concludes his speech to the FBI. He is greeted by his family outside the building. He now has a grandson. The family drives away, passing by historic D.C. landmarks.

Cast
 James Stewart as John Michael "Chip" Hardesty
 Vera Miles as Lucy Ann Hardesty
 Murray Hamilton as Sam Crandall
 Larry Pennell as George Crandall
 Nick Adams as John Gilbert "Jack" Graham
 Diane Jergens as Jennie Hardesty
 Jean Willes as Anna Sage
 Joyce Taylor as Anne Hardesty
 Victor Millan as Mario
J. Edgar Hoover as himself
Special Agent Lewis Gene Libby as unnamed FBI agent

Production
The Federal Bureau of Investigation had great influence over the production, with J. Edgar Hoover acting as a co-producer of sorts. Hoover had LeRoy re-shoot several scenes he didn't think portrayed the FBI in an appropriate light, and played a pivotal role in the casting for the film. Hoover and LeRoy were personal friends. Hoover had to approve every frame of the film and also had two special agents with LeRoy for the duration of filming. Hoover himself appears briefly in the film.

Comic book adaption
 Dell Four Color #1069 (November 1959)

See also
 List of American films of 1959

References
Footnotes

Citations

External links

1959 films
1959 crime drama films
American crime drama films
Films scored by Max Steiner
Films directed by Mervyn LeRoy
Films about the Ku Klux Klan
Warner Bros. films
Films about the Federal Bureau of Investigation
Films adapted into comics
Cultural depictions of John Dillinger
Cultural depictions of Machine Gun Kelly
Cultural depictions of Pretty Boy Floyd
Cultural depictions of Baby Face Nelson
Films about police officers
Films set in the 1920s
Films set in the 1930s
Films set in the 1940s
1950s English-language films
1950s American films